Carballo is originally a (Spanish, Galician, Catalan and Basque), surname. It is derived from both a Galician and Portuguese word meaning oak, referring to the family's settlement's surroundings of forest on mountainous terrain in A Coruña, Galicia, the north western part of Spain. Over the years, the surname has become more frequent in other countries and the name has had variations in its spelling. It became widely renowned in the early 1600s in the Spanish colonization of the Americas or New Spain and greatly expanded during the 1800s. It spread from South America, Central America, Mexico and North America, also including the Philippine islands, Cuba and Puerto Rico, territories of Spanish Colonialism or colonial expansion under the Crown of Castile during Spanish holdings in the Age of Discovery.

Origin of name
Carballo has many variations in its spelling including Carvallo, Carbello, Caballero, Carvalho, Carbalho, Caraballo, Carbajo, Carvajal, Caballer, Cabral, Caballe, Carballino, Caballería, de Caballos, Caballo, Cavallón, Cavallero, Cabrillo and Carbralo, and partly due to illiteracy in early times. Surnames like Carballo transform in their pronunciation and spelling as they travel across villages, family branches and countries. In times when literacy was uncommon, names such as Carballo were written down based on their pronunciation when people's names were written in government records. This could have led to misspellings of Carballo. Researching the misspellings and alternate spellings of the Carballo last name are vital to understanding the possible origins of the name.

Some of the first spelling variations for the origins of old name Carballo were found in the County of Castile in medieval Spain. While the patronymic and metronymic surnames, which are derived from the name of the father and mother respectively, are the most common form of a hereditary surname in Spain, occupational surnames are also emerged during the late Middle Ages. Many people, such as the Carballo family, adopted the name of their occupation as their surname. The surname Carballo was an occupational name for a knight or a knight's servant.

Carballo family
The name Carballo is documented as far back as 759 AD to Avilense Carballo alongside Morales, and Sebastian recorded by "Menendez Valdez, Miriano". There was a religious crusade with the Archbishop of Spain, the King of Spain and the country of Italy. First records found are of the early 16th century, starting with a military captain in the Spanish royal navy who was made Marquis for his leadership in a Spanish war. His name is Ferdinand Carballo.

Discoverers and voyagers
 
The 'Carballo family began its travel to the Americas about the same time as Christopher Columbus. Some of the first Spanish voyagers and or settlers of this family name or its variants were among the earliest explorers or Conquistadors of the[New World were Juan de Cavallón, a Spanish military captain, who voyaged to the Americas in the early 1500s. He claimed the territory of Costa Rica for the Spanish Crown and died in Mexico in 1565. Other early migrants to the New World included Gutierre de Caballos, who sailed to the Americas in 1512.
, Joao Lopez Carvalho, maritime pilot of the ship Concepción, acted as captain general on May 2, 1521, who took command after Ferdinand Magellan's death in the Philippines (April 27, 1521). Pedro Álvares Cabral (1468–1520) a Portuguese nobleman, military commander, navigator and explorer regarded as the discoverer of Brazil. Cabral conducted the first substantial exploration of the northeast coast of South America and claimed it for Portugal. Juan Rodríguez Cabrillo (1499–1543) was a navigator and explorer, known for exploring the west coast of North America on behalf of the Spanish Empire. Cabrillo was the first European explorer to navigate the coast of present-day California in the United States. Port captain at Cádiz, Juan Bautista Topete y Carballo, (May 24, 1821 – October 29, 1885), a Spanish naval commander and politician, born in San Andrés Tuxtla, Mexico. His father and grandfather were also Spanish admirals. Spaniard captain, Rodrigo Flores de Valdez Carballo, (c.1585), Villa de Cangas de Tineo, Principado de Asturias, Kingdom of León.

Carballo is recognized by the Spanish Royal Crown. The family coat of arms is as follows: "Golden Shield, waves of blue under a grand oak tree,at the top of the shield, is placed a closed Royal Crown, per Spanish Royal Decree 544/2005, (October 31, 2005), D.O.G. No. 209 "

The Carballo family motto is Upwards and Onwards, derived from the Kingdom of Spain Plus ultra (motto) Latin, translates to "Further Beyond"

The Carvalho and Carvallo families

Carvalho
The Portuguese branch of the lineage is traced back to Bartolomeo Domingues de Carvalho', whose son Fernao Gomez de Carvalho was a military officer under the son of King Dinis of Portugal. One of the sons of Fernao, Gil Fernandes de Carvalho, was made a nobleman in Spain as part of the Order of the Caballeros de Santiago.

The coat of arms of the Carvalho family is described as follows: "Three ostrich feathers on top of the navy blue shield. On the navy blue shield, there is one bright golden eight point star surrounded by eight white crescent moons."

Another important ancestor is Sebastião José de Carvalho e Mello, Marquês de Pombal (1699–1782), a Portuguese statesman, who was the virtual ruler of the country during the reign (1750–77) of Joseph Emanuel.  Sebastião was born in Lisbon on May 13, 1699, and educated at the University of Coimbra.

In 1738, he was appointed Ambassador to London and seven years later was sent to Vienna in a similar capacity. In 1750, Joseph I of Portugal appointed him minister of state and he soon proved his administrative talents. When the devastating 1755 Lisbon earthquake struck, he organized the relief efforts and planned its rebuilding.

He was made Chief Minister in 1756, and from then on his powers were practically absolute. Sebastião abolished slavery in Portugal, reorganized the educational system and published a new code of laws. He effected the reorganization of the army, the introduction of new colonists into the Portuguese settlements, and the establishment of an East India Company and other companies for trade with Brazil. Agriculture, commerce and finances were all improved. The king made him a marquis in 1770. Sebastião's power ended with the death of the king and he retired to Pombal, Paraíba, where he died on May 8, 1782.

Carvallo
The Carvallo name is the Lusitan form of the Galician name Carballo.Its origin is derived from the name of the place where one lived or the property owner was from and the founder of the lineage.

Carvallo was taken directly from "Carballo", which was a place in the province of Lugo in Galicia. Hence, someone from that province was someone from Carballo.  Carballo comes from the Portuguese word carvalho, which means oak. Therefore, this name means the place where the oaks come from.

In Portugal, Carvalho is also the name of a province in the district of Pe acova, within the Carvalho Mountains. In Spain, during the Reconquista, the name Carballo was extended from Galicia to the Iberian Peninsula and to the Canary Islands.

The spelling of the name Carvallo, with a "v", dates its origins back to Viscaya or the Biscay. During most recent findings, several members of this lineage sailed for the New World in the latter 19th century, arriving in countries like Chile, Argentina, Mexico, United States and Venezuela.

The lineage that established itself in Venezuela built roots in Caracas and Valencia. Most of the members of this lineage became businessmen, lawyers, politicians and economists.

On the branch that settled itself in Valencia, six members have been governors of the city and its state over the last 100 years

Sports players 

 Diego de Souza Carballo, Uruguayan soccer player.
 Manuel Carballo, (1982) Spanish artistic gymnast
 Marcelo Carballo, Bolivian football defender
 Miguel Ángel Carballo, Argentine professional golfer 
 Ramiro Carballo, Salvadoran professional footballplayer 
 Carlos Velasco Carballo, (1971) Spanish professional football referee
 Jesus Carballo, Spanish gymnast, 1996 and 2004 Summer Olympics 
 Néstor Carballo, Uruguayan football defender in the 1954 FIFA World Cup
 Ramiro Carballo, (1978) Salvadoran professional soccer player.
 Marcelo Carballo,(1974) Bolivian football defender 
 Héctor Federico Carballo, (1980) Argentine soccer player.
 Ezequiel Carballo, (1989) Argentine soccer player.
 Hugo Carballo, (1944) Chilean soccer player.
 Ignacio Pedro Moreno Carballo, (1951) football player for Spain's La Liga
 Leandro Carballo, baseball pitcher, 1987 California Angels.
 Andy Carballo, baseball pitcher, 2007 Metropolitanos de La Habana 
 Michael Victor Carballo, baseball outfielder – 2013 Great Falls Voyagers
 Gary Carballo, baseball player, third basemen – Baseball City Royals, 1992
 Jose Carballo, (1994) first base/catcher- Bethune-Cookman Wildcats
 Enrique Carballo,(1980) baseball pitcher, 1998 AZL México Stars
 Julio Carballo, (1968) baseball shortstop, 1990 Northwest League
 Pablo Juan Carballo, (1958) baseball 1st/3rd baseman/outfielder,1978 New York-Pennsylvania League
 Valeria Carballo, open race car driver, Venezuelan, EuroFormula 2011
 Carvalho Leite (1912–2004), Brazilian soccer player.
 Ricardo Carvalho (1978), Portuguese soccer player. AS Monaco in Ligue 1, played central defense.
 Kléber de Carvalho Corrêa (born 1980), Brazilian soccer player.
 Daniel da Silva Carvalho (born 1983), Brazilian soccer player.
 Alan Carvalho (born 1989), Brazilian soccer player.
 Carvalho Leite (1912–2004), Brazilian soccer player
 Fernando Carvallo (born 1948), Chilean soccer player and technical director
 José Carvallo (born 1986), Peruvian soccer player
 Aníbal Carvallo (born 1990), Chilean soccer player

Other notable Carballo's

 The first Lord of Carballo, Don Pedro Alvarez de Carballo, captain general Alcazar
 Adolfo Cesar Carballo, (d-, April 10, 2004) army specialist, served Operation Iraqi Freedom, 1st Battalion, 21st Field Artillery Regiment, 1st Cavalry Division, Fort Hood, Texas
 Bishop Salomón Carballo, (1949) director of the Salesians College of San Juan Bosco El Salvador
 María Elena Carballo, Costa Rican politician
 Manuel Carballo, (1941) epidemiologist, executive director of the International Centre for Migration, Health and Development, New York City.
 Anthony P. "Tex" Carballo, (April 17, 2016) served in the US Navy, Korean War

Other spellings

Carvalho
 2nd Marquês de Pombal, Henrique José de Carvalho e Melo (1748–1812)
 Delfim Carlos de Carvalho (1823–1896), Brazilian military.
 Otelo Saraiva de Carvalho (1936–2021), Portugal infantry lieutenant colonel and veteran of the war in Angola,
 Beth Carvalho (born 1946), Brazilian singer
 Paulo de Carvalho (born 1947), Portuguese singer.
 Mônica Carvalho (born 1971), actress and former Brazilian model

Carvallo
 Vicente Carvallo y Goyeneche (1742–1816), Chilean writer and military.
 Delfín Carvallo (1844–1882), lieutenant colonel in Chilean army, fought in the war against Spain, the Arauco War and the Pacific War.
 Andrés Héctor Carvallo (1862–1934), President of the Republic of Paraguay
 Pilar Carvallo (c. 1950-), Chilean geneticist.
 Bernardino Piñera Carvallo (born September 22, 1915) Roman Catholic Archbishop of La Serena

Gallery

Historical timeline for migration and military veteran burials

Travels
From 1820 to 1948, most Carballo immigrants to the U.S. came from Spain, Cuba, and Puerto Rico.
1914–1918 World War I: 49 Carballo draft registrants, with most registering in New York City.
1920: 44 Carballo households, 29% owned a home. 83.3% of the home owners and 60% of home renters were literate.
1939–1945 World War II: 13 Carballo soldiers joined the U.S. Army

Military burials
World War II 1939–1945 5 burials observed
Korean War 1950–1953 3 burials observed
Vietnam War 1961–1973 2 burials observed
Iraqi War 2003–2007 1 burial observed

References

External links
Concello de Carballo

Galician-language surnames
Spanish families
European royal families